Rafael de Souza Oliveira (born 16 June 1988 in Nanuque, Brazil) is a Brazilian former professional footballer who last played for Phnom Penh Crown of the Cambodian League in 2014.

Thể Công
In 2009, Rafael Oliveira played for Thể Công in the V-League, Vietnamese top-flight football league. He finished the 2009 season scoring 3 goals.

Phnom Penh Crown
Revealed as one of 2011 Cambodian League titleholders Phnom Penh Crown foreign signings for the 2014 season, Oliveira made his debut for the club in the opening game of 2014, which ended in a 4-0 victory over AEU. However, mainly due to limited playing time due to injuries, and the foreign player quota, the Brazilian midfielder's contract was not renewed.

References

External links
 Footballdatabase.eu

1988 births
Expatriate footballers in Vietnam
Expatriate footballers in Cambodia
Than Quang Ninh FC players
Brazilian footballers
Brazilian expatriate footballers
Association football midfielders
V.League 1 players
Phnom Penh Crown FC players
Brazilian expatriate sportspeople in Vietnam
Viettel FC players
Living people
Brazilian expatriate sportspeople in Cambodia